The Roman Catholic Diocese of Kole is a diocese located in the city of Kole  in the Ecclesiastical province of Kananga in the Democratic Republic of the Congo. It is coterminous with the Territoires ("counties") of Kole, Dekese and Lomela.

History
 June 14, 1951: Established as Apostolic Prefecture of Kole from the Apostolic Vicariate of Léopoldville
 September 14, 1967: Promoted as Diocese of Kole
 October 2007: Bishop Stanislas Lukumwena left Kole under duress due to intertribal animosity. As of December 2008, he has not returned.

Leadership, in reverse chronological order
 Bishops of Kole (Latin Rite), below
 Bishop Emery Kibal Mansong'loo, C.P. (2015.05.06 – present)
 Bishop Stanislas Lukumwena Lumbala, O.F.M. (1998.02.14 – 2008.10.30)
 Bishop Louis Nkinga Bondala, C.I.C.M. (1980.01.28 – 1996.03.13)
 Bishop Victor Van Beurden, SS.CC. (1967.09.14 – 1980.01.28); see below
 Prefect Apostolic of Kole (Latin Rite) 
 Father Victor Van Beurden, SS.CC. (1951.06.22 – 1967.09.14); see above

See also
Roman Catholicism in the Democratic Republic of the Congo
Kole, Democratic Republic of the Congo

Sources
 GCatholic.org
 Catholic Hierarchy

Roman Catholic dioceses in the Democratic Republic of the Congo
Christian organizations established in 1951
Roman Catholic dioceses and prelatures established in the 20th century
1951 establishments in the Belgian Congo
Roman Catholic Ecclesiastical Province of Kananga